St. John's High School, Amalapuram is a private Catholic primary and secondary school located in Amalapuram, East Godavari, Andhra Pradesh, India. The high school was founded in 1968, followed in 1985 by an English medium primary school. The Society of Jesus has managed both schools since 2002.

History
St. John's High School at Amalapuram, named after St. John the Apostle, was established in 1968 by the Catholic Diocese of Vijayawada as the first Catholic school in the area of Konaseema. The teaching staff consisted of lay persons. It is coeducational and relies on benefactors for its existence. Since 1976 Amalapuram has been a part of the newly formed Diocese of Eluru.

In 1985 Loyola English Medium Primary School (LKG to X std.) was opened on the same , including the parish church.

In 2002 the Jesuits acceded to the Bishop's request and assumed responsibility for the two schools.

See also

 List of Jesuit schools

References

Jesuit secondary schools in India
Schools in East Godavari district
Christian schools in Andhra Pradesh
Jesuit primary schools in India
Educational institutions established in 1968
1968 establishments in Andhra Pradesh